Jeremi Aldair Escate Gallegos (born 4 March 2002) is a Peruvian footballer who plays as a midfielder for Alianza Lima.

Career statistics

Club

Notes

References

2002 births
Living people
Peruvian footballers
Peru youth international footballers
Association football midfielders
Club Alianza Lima footballers
Footballers from Lima